Slavin Slavchev (born 7 March 1991) is a Bulgarian singer and songwriter currently a lead vocal and bass guitarist in Julian's Laughter. He is the winner of the 2014 season of Bulgarian X Factor.

Career

2014–2015:X Factor Bulgaria
Slavchev was part of the third season of X Factor and won it. In the first week of the show he performed Cryin' by Aerosmith. Zaki said that after this performance he believed that Slavchev could give a new life to the rock music in Europe. He moved on to week 2 by being among the highest number of vote winners. Second week was a Halloween night where he performed Love Runs Out by OneRepublic. In the next week's show he performed "Give in to Me" and the Bulgarian song "Блус за двама". After his performance of Queen's hit "Who Wants to Live Forever" the judges called it the best performance of the season and that they see him as a potential winner. At the final show he presented a duet with Joe Lynn Turner performing the Rainbow's song "Street of Dreams" He won the show after this being on the final with Mihaela Marinova (third) and Nevena Peykova (runner-up).

2015–2017: Debut singles
Exclusive in the final of X Factor he performed him first solo single "Ela" (Come). Lately it was released and a video of the song which had scenes from all performs of Slavin on X Factor's stage. In the summer of 2015 he released and him 2nd single "Losh Sum za Teb" (I'm bad for you) by Wow Productions. The Bulgarian model Queenie-Alice Nicolova took part in the video.

2017–present: Julian's Laughter
In 2017 Slavin, together with Miloslav Petrov, Tihomir Vasilev and Nikolay Nikolaev established the alternative/art rock band Julian's Laughter.

Discography

Personal life
Slavchev studied law in Veliko Tarnovo University. He is a member and front-man of the hard-rock/progressive/alternative band Century (formed in Varna, Bulgaria in 2012). During the show he announced that he broke up with his girlfriend.

External links
 
 Official Facebook page

References

1991 births
Living people
Musicians from Varna, Bulgaria
Bulgarian rock singers
21st-century Bulgarian male singers
X Factor (Bulgarian TV series)
The X Factor winners